Kadrina Parish is a rural municipality in Lääne-Viru County, northern Estonia. It covers an area of 329.26 km² (10% of the total area of the county) and has a population of 5,156 (as of January 1, 2004). The parish has had its current borders since 2005, when Saksi Parish was dissolved and Kiku, Pariisi and Salda villages were merged to Kadrina Parish, the larger part of Saksi Parish was added to Tapa Parish.

The administrative centre is the small borough (alevik) of Kadrina, which has a population of 2,600. Other major populated places are the small borough of Hulja (600 inhabitants) and the villages of Kihlevere (200 inhabitants), Vohnja (200 inhabitants) and Viitna (100 inhabitants). There are 32 villages in total.

The northern border of the municipality is also the southern border of Lahemaa National Park.

The Tallinn–Narva road (nr 1, part of E20) and the Tallinn–Saint Petersburg railway run through Kadrina Parish.

Settlements
Small boroughs
Hulja, Kadrina

Villages
Ama, Arbavere, Hõbeda, Härjadi, Jõepere, Jõetaguse, Jürimõisa, Kadapiku, Kallukse, Kihlevere, Kiku, Kõrveküla, Lante, Leikude, Loobu, Läsna, Mõndavere, Mäo, Neeruti, Ohepalu, Orutaguse, Pariisi, Põima, Ridaküla, Rõmeda,  Salda, Saukse, Sootaguse, Tirbiku, Tokolopi, Udriku,  Uku, Undla, Vaiatu, Vandu, Viitna, Vohnja, Võduvere, Võipere

Religion

Gallery

References

External links